Ravi Shankar had numerous solo recordings published, including these:

Studio and live albums 
Three Ragas (1956)
Music of India (1962)
Improvisations (1962)
In Concert (1962)
Ravi Shankar (Odeon Records, India catalogue) (1963)
India's Master Musician (1963)
In London (1964)
Ragas & Talas (1964)
The Master Musicians of India (with Ali Akbar Khan) (1964)
Portrait of Genius (1964)
Ravi Shankar and Ali Akbar Khan (1965)
Sound of the Sitar (1965)
West Meets East with Yehudi Menuhin (also titled Menuhin Meets Shankar) (1967)
In San Francisco (1967)
The Exotic Sitar and Sarod (1967)
Two Raga Moods (1967)
Live: Ravi Shankar at the Monterey International Pop Festival (1967)
A Morning Raga / An Evening Raga (1968)
The Sounds of India (1968)
In New York (1968)
West Meets East, Volume 2 with Yehudi Menuhin (1968)
Music from India serie no.8  (1968)
A Sitar Recital (1968)
Ravi Shankar Improvisations & theme from Pather Panchali (1968)
Ravi Shankar's Festival from India (1968)
Ravi Shankar (1969)
At the Woodstock Festival (1969)
Music of India A Dhun and a Raga with Ali Akbar Khan (1969)
Ravi Shankar Raga Parameshwari (1970)
Six Ragas (1970)
The Exciting Music of Ravi Shankar (1970)
Four Raga Moods (1971)
PBP Ravi Shankar and PBU Ahmedjan Thirakhwa (1971)
Joi Bangla EP (1971)
Concerto for Sitar & Orchestra with the London Symphony Orchestra and André Previn (1971)
 The Concert for Bangladesh (1971) – side one only, with Ali Akbar Khan
The Genius of Ravi Shankar (1972)
Ravi Shankar (1972)
Ravi Shankar Ragas (1972)
The Masters of Indian Music  (1972) (double album with Ali Albar Khan)
In Concert 1972 with Ali Akbar Khan (1973)
Ragas with Ali Akbar Khan – contains The Master Musicians of India (1964) and the Ali Akbar Khan album The Soul of Indian Music (1965) (released as a double album in 1973)
Shankar Family & Friends (1974) – available as part of Shankar and George Harrison box set Collaborations (2010)
Ravi Shankar's Music Festival from India (1976) – available as part of Collaborations box set (2010)
Improvisations – West Meets East 3 – with Yehudi Menuhin and Jean-Pierre Rampal (1976)
Ravi Shankar (1979)
Shankar in Japan (1979)
Jazzmine (1980) – with George Adams and others
The Spirit of India (Deutsche Grammophon, 1980)
Homage to Mahatma Gandhi (1981)
Raga-Mala (Sitar Concerto No. 2) (1982)
Raga Mishra Piloo: duet for sitar & sarod (1983) – with Ali Akbar Khan
Pandit Ravi Shankar (1986)
Tana Mana (1987)
Ravi Shankar: the Doyen of Hindustani Music (1988)
Inside the Kremlin (1988)
Passages with Philip Glass (1990) (Atlantic Records)
Concert for Peace: Royal Albert Hall (1995)
Genesis (1995)
Towards the Rising Sun (1996)
Ravi Shankar: In Celebration (1996)
Chants of India (1997) – available as part of Collaborations box set (2010)
Raga Tala (1997)
Shankar: Sitar Concertos and Other Works (1998)
Shankar: Raga Jogeshwari (1998)
Vision of Peace: The Art of Ravi Shankar (2000)
Full Circle: Carnegie Hall 2000 (2001)
Between Two Worlds (documentary directed by Mark Kidel) (2001)
Flowers of India (2007)
More Flowers of India (2008)
Collaborations box set, with George Harrison (2010)
Symphony with London Philharmonic Orchestra and David Murphy (2012)
The Living Room Sessions Part 1 (2012)
The Living Room Sessions Part 2 (2013)
A Night at St. John the Divine (2014)
In Hollywood, 1971 (2016)
Ghanashyam: A Broken Branch (2017)
Live in Copenhagen(2020)

Film music 
 Neecha Nagar (1946, directed by Chetan Anand)
 The Apu Trilogy (1955–1959, directed by Satyajit Ray)

 A Chairy Tale (1957, directed by Norman McLaren)
 Parash Pathar (1958, directed by Satyajit Ray)
 Anuradha (1960, directed by Hrishikesh Mukherjee)
 Godaan (1963, directed by Trilok Jetley)
 Alice in Wonderland (1966, directed by Jonathan Miller) – composer of original score
 Chappaqua (1966, directed by Conrad Rooks)
 Monterey Pop (1968, documentary by D.A. Pennebaker)
 Charly (1968, directed by Ralph Nelson)
 Raga (1971, directed by Howard Worth)
 The Concert for Bangladesh by Saul Swimmer (1972) organized by George Harrison with Ravi Shankar
 Viola (1973, produced by R. Davis), British art film, soundtrack album: Transmigration Macabre, Spark Records SRLM 2002 
 Forbidden Image (1974, directed by Jeremy Marre)
 Meera (1979, Directed by Gulzar)
 Gandhi (1982, directed by Richard Attenborough), (Academy Award nomination for Shankar and George Fenton)
 Genesis (1986)
 Concert for George (2003, directed by David Leland)

References

Discographies of Indian artists